Julio Méndez Alemán (November 29, 1933 – April 11, 2012) was a Mexican actor.

Biography 

Alemán was born in Morelia, Michoacán. After studying to be an agronomical engineer, he turned to show business. His first film was El Zarco in 1957. During the late 1960s and early 1970s, he was the MC of the Mexican version of the Italian children's puppet show Topo Gigio.

Alemán appeared in more than 151 films and was elected, for a period, chairman of the Mexican actors' union, the Asociación Nacional de Actores (National Actors' Association).

Death
Alemán died in Mexico City on April 11, 2012. He had been diagnosed with lung cancer. His remains were cremated and a memorial service was held on April 12, 2012, in Mexico City.

Filmography

Telenovelas

 Soy tu dueña as Ernesto Galeana (2010) 
 Corazón salvaje as narrator / Judge Pedro Solana (2009-2010)
 Las tontas no van al cielo as Don Arturo Molina (2008)
 Amor sin maquillaje as himself (2007) 
 Destilando Amor as Roberto Avellaneda (2007)
 La verdad oculta as Adolfo Avila (2006)
 Mujer de madera as Aarón Santibáñez (2004-2005)
 Amor real as Joaquin Fuentes Guerra (2003)
 Las vías del amor as Don Alberto Betanzos (2002-2003)
 Mi destino eres tú as Augusto Rodriguez Franco (2000)
 Alma rebelde as Diego (1999)
 "Cuento de Navidad" as Severo Rubiales Conde (1999)
 "Infamia" as Victor Andreu (1981)
 "Sandra y Paulina" as Andres (1980)
 "Dos a quererse" (1977)
 "Pobre Clara" as Cristian De La Huerta (1975)
 "Sacrificio de Mujer" as Miguel Angel (1972)
 "El adorable profesor Aldao" as Mariano Aldao (1971)
 "El Ciego" (1969)
 "Rocambole" (1967)
 "Nuestro barrio" (1965)
 "La Cobarde" (1962)
 "Sor Juana Ines de la Cruz" (1962)
 "El otro" (1960)
 "Senda prohibida" (1958)

Peliculas

 "Tango das mortes" (2007)
 "Dos bien puestos" (2006)
 "No hay derecho joven" as San Pedro (2006)
 "Se les pelo Baltazar" (2006)
 "Un Artista del hambre" (2005)
 "Emboscada de federales" (2003)
 "La Estampa del escorpion" (2002)
 "La Dama de la Texana" (2001)
 "Padres culpables" as Sebastian (2001)
 "Tambien las mujeres pueden" (2001)
 "Cuando el poder es" as Maestro (2000)
 "Agarren al de los huevos" as Don Aurelio (2000)
 "El Tesoro del Pilar" (2000)
 "Milenio, el principio del fin" (2000)
 "Venganza contra el reloj" (1999)
 "Puño de lodo" (1999)
 "La Fiesta de los perrones" (1999)
 "La Hijas de Xuchi Paxuchil" (1999)
 "Si nos dejan" (1999)
 "Acabame de matar" as comandante (1998)
 "La Paloma y El Gavilan" as Don Artemio (1998)
 "Secuestro: Aviso de muerte" (1998)
 "Veinte años después" (1998)
 "Mujeres bravas" (1998)
 "La Banda del mocha orejas" (1998)
 "Raza indomable" (1998)
 "Hembras con valor de muerte" (1998)
 "Bronco" (1991)
 "La Hora 24" as Pedro de Limantur (1990)
 "Funerales del terror" (1990)
 "Vacaciones de terror" as Fernando (1989)
 "Mi fantasma y yo" (1988)
 "Ladron" (1988)
 "Sabado D.F." (1988)
 "La Leyenda del Manco" (1987)
 "Policia de narcoticos" as Mr. de la Parra (1986)
 "El Cafre" (1986)
 "La Carcel de Laredo" (1985)
 "Prohibido amar en Nueva York" (1984)
 "Territorio sin ley" (1984)
 "Pedro el de Guadalajara" (1983)
 "Los Dos matones" (1983)
 "El Ahorcado" as Regino (1983)
 "Inseminacion artificial" (1983)
 "La Contrabandista" (1982)
 "Padre por accidente" (1981)
 "La Agonia del difunto" (1981)
 "Tiempo para amar" (1980)
 "Pelea de perros" (1980)
 "Del otro lado del puente" (1980)
 "El Cara parchada" as Joe (1980)
 "El Tren de la muerte" as Alvaro Cortes (1979)
 "Los Japoneses no esperan" (1978)
 "Deportados" (1977)
 "Un Mulato llamado Martin" (1975)
 "Un Amor extraño" (1975)
 "Un Camino al cielo" (1975)
 "Los Valientes de Guerrero" (1974)
 "Mi amorcito de Suecia" as Marcelo (1974)
 "Adios, amor" as Martin (1973)
 "Diamantes, oro y amor" (1973)
 "El Imponente" (1973)
 "Mi mesera" (1973)
 "El Sargento Perez" (1973)
 "Tampico" (1972)
 "El Arte de engañar" (1972)
 "La Pequeña señora de Perez" (1972)
 "Rio salvaje" (1971)
 "El Idolo" (1971)
 "En esta cama nadie duerme" (1971)
 "Los Novios" as Antonio Dominguez (1971)
 "Los Corrompidos" as Martin (1971)
 "La Viuda blanca" as Martin Duran (1970)
 "El Tunco maclovio" as El Tunco Maclovio Castro (1970)
 "Cruz de amor" (1970)
 "La Muralla verde" as Mario (1970)
 "Una Mujer para los sabados" (1970)
 "Como enfriar a mi marido" (1970)
 "La Trinchera" (1969)
 "Trampas de amor" (1969)
 "Préstame a tu mujer" (1969)
 "Patsy, mi amor" as Ricardo (1969)
 "Una Noche bajo la tormenta" (1969)
 "Peligro...! Mujeres en acción" as Alex Dinamo (1969)
 "Valentin Armienta el vengador" (1969)
 "La Guerrillera de Villa" (1969)
 "El Yaqui" (1969)
 "Las Pirañas aman en Cuaresma" as Raul (1969)
 "Corazón salvaje" as Juan del Diablo (1968)
 "Amor perdoname" (1968)
 "Los Angeles de Puebla" as Leonardo Reyes (1968)
 "Mujeres, mujeres, mujeres" (1967)
 "Rocambole contra la secta del escorpion" as Rocambole (1967)
 "SOS Conspiracion Bikini" as Alex Dinamo (1967)
 "Rocambole contra las mujeres arpías" as Rocambole (1967)
 "La Perra" as Lucas (1967)
 "Mariana" (1967)
 "The Partisan of Villa'' as Ricardo Peñalver (1967)
 "El derecho de nacer" as Alberto Limonta (1966)
 "Sangre en Rio Bravo" (1966)
 "Solo de noche vienes" (1966)
 "Me ha gustado un hombre" (1965)
 "Preciosa" (1965)
 "Los Hijos que yo soñé" (1965)
 "Mi héroe" (1965)
 "Diablos en el cielo" (1965)
 "Napoleoncito" (1964)
 "Yo, el valiente" (1964)
 "Los Novios de mis hijas" as Lorenzo Robles (1964)
 "Historia de un canalla" as Julio Benavente (1964)
 "Museo del horror" (1964)
 "Amor y sexo" as Raul Solana (1964)
 "La Sonrisa de los pobres" (1964)
 "La Edad de la violencia" as Fuentes (1964)
 "El Hombre de papel" (1963)
 "La Diosa impura" as Julio (1963)
 "La Risa de la ciudad" (1963)
 "Una Joven de 16 años" (1963)
 "Neutrón contra el Dr. Caronte" (1963)
 "Cuando los hijos se pierden" (1963)
 "Me dicen el consentido" (1962)
 "La Muerte pasa lista" (1962)
 "Nostradamus, el genio de las tinieblas" as Antonio (1962)
 "La Barranca sangrienta" (1962)
 "Locos por la música" (1962)
 "El Látigo negro contra los farsantes" (1962)
 "La Venganza del resucitado" (1962)
 "Los Autómatas de la muerte" (1962)
 "Los Encapuchados del infierno" (1962)
 "Nostradamus y el destructor de monstruos" as Antonio (1962)
 "Neutrón el enmascarado negro" as Caronte (1962)
 "Nuestros odiosos maridos" (1962)
 "La Marca del gavilán" (1962)
 "Juventud sin Dios" as Raymundo (1962)
 "Con la misma moneda" (1961)
 "Los Inocentes" (1961)
 "Los Hermanos Del Hierro" as Martin Del Hierro (1961)
 "Aventuras del látigo negro" (1961)
 "La Maldición de Nostradamus" as Antonio (1961)
 "Los Jovenes" as El Gato (1961)
 "Tres Romeos y una Julieta" (1961)
 "Tirando a matar" (1961)
 "La Sangre de Nostradamus" as Antonio (1961)
 "Simitrio" (1960)
 "La Cigüeña dijo sí" (1960)
 "Impaciencia del corazón" (1960)
 "La Maldición de Nostradamus" as Antonio (1960)
 "Neutrón, el enmascarado negro" (1960)
 "La Edad de la tentación" (1959)
 "Una Abuelita atómica" (1958)
 "El Zarco" (1957)

TV series
 "Diseñador ambos sexos" as Don Felix Marquez (2001)
 "Club familiar" as host (1989)
 "Jueves Espectaculares" as host (1971)

References

External links

1933 births
2012 deaths
20th-century Mexican male actors
21st-century Mexican male actors
Mexican male film actors
Mexican male telenovela actors
People from Morelia
Male actors from Michoacán
Deaths from lung cancer in Mexico